Inside Information is the sixth studio album by the British-American rock band Foreigner, released on December 7, 1987.  The album debuted at 15, on the Billboard 200 Albums Chart and was certified Platinum in the U.S. for sales exceeding one million copies. Although a huge standard by any country's charting method, the band's sales were certainly plummeting since the release of 4 in 1981. It was the last album to feature the '80s core lineup of Gramm, Jones, Wills, and Elliott.

"Say You Will" was released as the album's first single. Allmusic later noted that the single was a "good example" of the band's "balancing act" as "the guitar-heavy style of their early work gave way to slick arrangements that pushed electronics to the fore...temper(ing) its rock guitar edge...and Lou Gramm's quasi-operatic vocals...by thick layers of chiming synthesizers and an array of electronic textures." The single reached #6 on the Billboard Hot 100 and became their fourth #1 hit on the Billboard Hot Mainstream Rock Tracks chart, holding the top spot for four weeks. The song also became the band's third-highest charting hit in Germany, where it reached #22, faring even better in Switzerland, the Netherlands, and particularly Norway, where it reached #4. A rare CD single featured an extended remix version of the track.

The second single, "I Don't Want to Live Without You", reached #5 on the Hot 100. Markedly softer than any of their work to date, the record was their first and only #1 on the Adult Contemporary chart, after the more rousing ballads "Waiting for a Girl Like You" and "I Want to Know What Love Is" had reached #5 and #3 on that chart respectively. Allmusic would later observe that while "the end result lacked the distinctive rock touches of past Foreigner ballads, "Lou Gramm" contributes a lead vocal that avoids histrionics in favor of an emotional but very smooth delivery" over "washes of synthesizer...fleshed out by some meditative electric piano riffs". Nevertheless, the song charted at mainstream rock radio, where it peaked at #18. The #5 Hot 100 peak was their best showing in six singles, yet despite being followed up by more impassioned, up-tempo material it would be their last major pop hit to date.

The next single from the album was "Heart Turns to Stone", which had peaked at #7 on the Hot Mainstream Rock Tracks chart in an earlier non-commercial release only to rock radio but only managed #56 on the Hot 100 several months later in 1988.  Cash Box said that even if "Heart Turns to Stone" could be called "corporate rock" the song works, and that "what Foriegner loses in pure originality they gain in accessibility and clarity."

"Heart Turns to Stone" was followed by the harder "Can't Wait", which matched the #18 Mainstream Rock Tracks charting of "I Don't Want to Live Without You" but failed to crack the Hot 100, as it was a non-commercial release except in Canada. The following year saw a successful solo album and singles from Lou Gramm and found Mick Jones releasing an album and producing for artists including Billy Joel.

"Out of the Blue" was notable for being the only song in the band's catalog to be credited to all four members from the classic 80's lineup.

Track listing

Personnel

Foreigner 
 Lou Gramm – lead vocals, percussion
 Mick Jones – keyboards, guitars, backing vocals
 Rick Wills – bass, backing vocals
 Dennis Elliott – drums

Additional personnel 
 Peter-John Vettese – keyboards
 Tom Bailey – additional keyboards (4)
 Kevin Jones – Synclavier
 Hugh McCracken – Spanish guitar (7)
 Sammy Merendino – electronic percussion
 Mark Rivera – saxophone (1), backing vocals
 Ian Lloyd – backing vocals

Production 
 Producer – Mick Jones
 Co-Producer, Recording, and Mixing – Frank Filipetti
 Assistant Engineer – Billy Miranda
 Mastered by Ted Jensen at Sterling Sound (New York City, NY).
 Technical Support – Kevin Jones
 Pre-Production Assistant – Warren Austerer
 Art Direction – Bob Defrin
 Group Photography – E.J. Camp
 Front and Back Photography – Roger Corbeau
 Management – Bud Prager

Charts

Weekly charts

Year-end charts

Certifications

References

Foreigner (band) albums
1987 albums
Albums produced by Mick Jones (Foreigner)
Atlantic Records albums